Mendik may refer to:

Surname:
Bernard H. Mendik (1929-2001), American real estate developer
Xavier Mendik (born 1967), English documentary filmmaker

Other:
Folle blanche, French grape variety